The Ferrovia Alifana is a former railway company of southern Italy. It held public passenger service on the rail line connection Naples to Piedimonte d'Alife (now Piedimonte Matese). In 2005 it was acquired by the MetroCampania NordEst (MCNE), another public company responsible of passenger transport in northern Campania.

History
The company was inaugurated on 30 March 1913, with a first service held on the line Naples P.zza Carlo III Station-Santa Maria Capua Vetere/S.Andrea dei Lagni-Biforcazione-Capua (43 km), with 11,000 V 25 Hz monophase AC electric traction. Service from Caiazzo to Piedimonte began in 1914, held with steam locomotives. A line from Naples/Secondigliano to Santa Maria Capua Vetere was opened later. Gauge was 935 mm for both lines.

The railway suffered heavy damage during World War II. While the first line was restored in 1963, using standard gauge and diesel traction, the railway from Secondigliano did not receive the same attention, and, despite its high traffic, was closed in 1976 and replaced by bus service. This move was to be temporary, but only in 2005 a renewed section of the line, connecting Piscinola to Mugnano, was reopened. 

In the same year the whole service on the Alifana railway was acquired by the new public company MetroCampania NordEst. The company is currently responsible of the service from Santa Maria Capua Vetere station, which had connection with the Trenitalia line to Naples, to Piedimonte Matese, and from Piscinola to Mugnano (to be extended to Teverola).

References

External links
"Friends of the Alifana" website 

Alifana
Railway lines opened in 1913
Italian companies established in 1913
Railway companies established in 1913